Morto may refer to:

Places
Mar Morto (sea), Portuguese name for Dead Sea in the Middle East
Boi Morto, a bairro in the District of Sede in the municipality of Santa Maria, in the Brazilian state of Rio Grande do Sul
Lago Morto, a lake in the Province of Treviso, Veneto, Italy
Morto Bay, or Bay of Morto, an inlet on the tip of Cape Helles on the Gallipoli Peninsula in Turkey
Morto River, a river of Santa Catarina state in southeastern Brazil
Pic Morto, a mountain of Catalonia, Spain

People
Mezzo Morto Hüseyin Pasha, or Hussein Mezzomorto (died 1701), an Ottoman privateer, bey (governor), and finally Grand Admiral (Kapudan Pasha) of the Ottoman Navy
Morto da Feltre, Italian painter of the Venetian school who worked at the close of the 15th century and beginning of the 16th
Mortó Dessai (1922-????), Indian medical analyst of Goan origin

Others
Juwana Morto, a former coastal artillery battery on the island of Aruba
Mar Morto, the Portuguese name for Sea of Death, a Brazilian Modernist novel written by Jorge Amado